Lars Ivar Hansen (born 21 November 1947) is a Norwegian historian.

He was employed at the University of Tromsø in 1976 and took the dr.philos. degree, specializing in Sami history. He became professor in 1991. He is a member of the Norwegian Academy of Science and Letters.

References

1947 births
Living people
20th-century Norwegian historians
Academic staff of the University of Tromsø
Members of the Norwegian Academy of Science and Letters
21st-century Norwegian historians